Half Ton Cup was an international sailing competition for the Half Ton class between 1967 and 1993.

Criteria
 Note 1. Boats can be either prototype or production models.
 Note 2. Often once a boat won the Half Ton Cup, the design was subsequently put into mass production. (Such as the Rob Humphries MGHS30 which was put into production in Scotland. A much modified example of the MGHS30 won the Half Ton Classics Cup 2013 which operates under the IRC handicap system.)
 Note 3. All boats race under the IOR handicap system without further handicap.

Winners

See also
One Ton Cup

References

Sailing competitions
Recurring sporting events established in 1967
Defunct sailing competitions